Myiopharus is a genus of flies in the family Tachinidae.

Species
Myiopharus aberrans (Townsend, 1916)
Myiopharus albomarginatus (Wulp, 1890)
Myiopharus albomicans (Wulp, 1890)
Myiopharus ambulatrix (Wulp, 1890)
Myiopharus americanus (Bigot, 1889)
Myiopharus ancillus (Walker, 1853)
Myiopharus angustus (Townsend, 1927)
Myiopharus apicalis (Brèthes, 1920)
Myiopharus argentata Nihei & Dios, 2016 (new name for Myiopharus argentescens (Townsend, 1935))
Myiopharus argentescens (Townsend, 1927)
Myiopharus assimilis (Townsend, 1919)
Myiopharus atra (Townsend, 1927)
Myiopharus atratula (Walker, 1853)
Myiopharus barbatus (Bigot, 1889)
Myiopharus basilaris (Wulp, 1890)
Myiopharus brasiliana (Brauer & von Bergenstamm, 1891)
Myiopharus brasiliensis (Townsend, 1927)
Myiopharus calyptratus (Williston, 1896)
Myiopharus canadensis Reinhard, 1945
Myiopharus capitata (Townsend, 1927)
Myiopharus carbonarius (Wulp, 1890)
Myiopharus castanifrons (Bigot, 1889)
Myiopharus claripalpis (Thompson, 1968)
Myiopharus connexus (Wulp, 1890)
Myiopharus conspersus (Wulp, 1890)
Myiopharus costalis (Walker, 1853)
Myiopharus crysocephalus (Bigot, 1889)
Myiopharus dejectus (Wulp, 1890)
Myiopharus dorsalis (Coquillett, 1898)
Myiopharus doryphorae (Riley, 1869)
Myiopharus dubia (Townsend, 1927)
Myiopharus exiguus (Wulp, 1890)
Myiopharus fimbricrurus (Wulp, 1890)
Myiopharus flaviventris (Wulp, 1890)
Myiopharus floridensis (Townsend, 1892)
Myiopharus frontalis (Townsend, 1927)
Myiopharus hemiargyroides (Townsend, 1927)
Myiopharus huascarayus (Townsend, 1917)
Myiopharus hyalinipennis (Wulp, 1890)
Myiopharus hyphena (Townsend, 1927)
Myiopharus inconspicuus (Wulp, 1890)
Myiopharus infernalis (Townsend, 1919)
Myiopharus jamaicensis (Curran, 1928)
Myiopharus leucocyclus (Wulp, 1890)
Myiopharus levis (Aldrich & Webber, 1924)
Myiopharus lutzi (Townsend, 1916)
Myiopharus macellus (Reinhard, 1935)
Myiopharus melanoceps (Bigot, 1889)
Myiopharus meridionalis (Townsend, 1929)
Myiopharus metopia Brauer & von Bergenstamm, 1889
Myiopharus moestus (Wulp, 1890)
Myiopharus murinus (Wulp, 1890)
Myiopharus nana (Townsend, 1934)
Myiopharus neilli O’Hara, 2007
Myiopharus niger (Brauer & von Bergenstamm, 1891)
Myiopharus nigricolor (Wulp, 1890)
Myiopharus nigrisquamis (Townsend, 1927)
Myiopharus nigritus (Wulp, 1890)
Myiopharus nitidus (Curran, 1934)
Myiopharus ochrifrons (Wulp, 1890)
Myiopharus ovatus (Wulp, 1890)
Myiopharus palpalis (Townsend, 1927)
Myiopharus palposus (Wulp, 1890)
Myiopharus parva (Townsend, 1927)
Myiopharus parvulus (Wulp, 1890)
Myiopharus paulista (Townsend, 1929)
Myiopharus pavidus (Wulp, 1890)
Myiopharus perplexus (Townsend, 1911)
Myiopharus pirioni Aldrich, 1934
Myiopharus punctilucis (Townsend, 1927)
Myiopharus ravus (Wulp, 1890)
Myiopharus refugus (Wulp, 1890)
Myiopharus securis Reinhard, 1945
Myiopharus secutoris (Reinhard, 1975)
Myiopharus sedulus (Reinhard, 1935)
Myiopharus subaeneus Aldrich, 1934
Myiopharus trifurca (Wulp, 1890)
Myiopharus unicolor (Wulp, 1890)
Myiopharus volucris (Wulp, 1890)
Myiopharus vulgata (Walker, 1853)
Myiopharus yahuarmayana (Townsend, 1927)
Myiopharus yahuarmayensis (Townsend, 1927)

References

Diptera of North America
Exoristinae
Tachinidae genera
Taxa named by Friedrich Moritz Brauer
Taxa named by Julius von Bergenstamm